Florence Paterson (November 3, 1927 – July 23, 1995) was a Canadian actress.

Early life 
The daughter of machinist and politician George Nightingale and Violet Noseworthy, she was born in St. John's, Newfoundland and was educated there.

Career 
Paterson taught school for a time and then trained in nursing. She married John Paterson. She joined the St. John's Players in 1954, won awards at several drama festivals in the province and performed on CBC radio. She moved to Halifax, Nova Scotia in 1972, where she performed with the Neptune Theatre Company. 

She played the role of Mary Mercer in David French's theatrical play Of the Fields, Lately in 1973, and later reprised the role in Mike Newell's 1976 television adaptation.

In 1989, she moved to Vancouver, British Columbia. She appeared in the 1990 movie Bird on a Wire, the 1990 television adaptation of Stephen King's "It" as Ms. Kersh, and the 1994 movie Little Women as Hannah. She also appeared in the CBC television series Backstretch.

Personal life 
Paterson died in Vancouver at the age of 67.

Filmography

Film

Television

References

External links 
 

1927 births
1995 deaths
20th-century Canadian actresses
Actresses from Newfoundland and Labrador
Canadian television actresses
People from St. John's, Newfoundland and Labrador